Víctor da Conceição Soares  is an East Timorese politician and academic, and a member of the Fretilin political party. He is the incumbent Minister of Petroleum and Minerals, serving since June 2020 under the VIII Constitutional Government of East Timor led by Taur Matan Ruak.

Early life and career
Soares is originally from Baucau, in eastern East Timor. In 1992, he obtained a bachelor's degree in mechanical production from Bandung Institute of Technology, Indonesia. Since then, he has obtained a PhD in technical science of territorial planning and environment from the University of Évora, Portugal, majoring in biosystems engineering and renewable energy-wind power.

From 1999 to 2001, Soares served as a UN local staff member in East Timor, and was the Supervisor for UNAMET-UNTAET Security Services. Since 2000, he has been a lecturer in mechanical engineering at the National University of East Timor (UNTL), and has also been a researcher in mechanical engineering and renewable energy, including wind power. From 2007 until 2010, he was Dean of the Faculty of Technical Engineering at UNTL.

Political career
From 10 July 2006 to 8 August 2007, Soares was also Vice Minister for Technical and Higher Education in the II Constitutional Government under Prime Minister José Ramos-Horta, and the III Constitutional Government led by Prime Minister Estanislau da Silva, respectively.

Soares was later appointed as an advisor to the East Timor Coffee Academy (ETICA) (now the ). From 2017 to 2020, he was a Member of UNTL General Council, and a Member of the Scientific Council of the National Institute for Science and Technology ( (INCT)).

On 24 June 2020, following a change in the governing coalition, and the admission of Fretilin to the VIII Constitutional Government, Soares was sworn in as Minister of Petroleum and Minerals.

Soares took that office intending to undertake a restructuring of East Timor's oil and gas sector, with the objective of improving the quality of the services provided in that sector. Additionally, the proposal for the Tasi Mane LNG project was sent to the national audit office for re-evaluation.

In an interview published at the end of August 2020, Soares said that oil and gas industry strategy had given priority to policy ahead of technical issues and economic viability, and that the strategy had to be reversed. He also claimed that the government had made a big mistake in investing in the Greater Sunrise consortium, and that the investment had been a purely political decision, not based on the technical analysis of the company or the technicians.

Honours
In 2000, Soares was awarded a UN Certificate as a UNAMET Staff Member, and in 2013 he was decorated by the government of East Timor as a Combatant of National Liberation.

References

External links 

Bandung Institute of Technology alumni
Fretilin politicians
Government ministers of East Timor
Living people
University of Évora alumni
Year of birth missing (living people)

21st-century East Timorese politicians